KK Viimsi, for sponsorship reasons known as KK Viimsi/Sportland, is an Estonian basketball club based in Viimsi. The team plays its home games at Karulaugu Spordikeskus, which has capacity for 500 people. 

Since the 2021–22 season, the team plays in the Latvian-Estonian Basketball League after winning the 1. Liiga championship.

Players

Current roster

Depth chart

Honours
Latvian-Estonian Basketball League
Runner up (1): 2022
1. Liiga
Champions (1): 2020–21

Notable players

References

External links
Official website

Basketball teams in Estonia
Viimsi Parish
Korvpalli Meistriliiga